Due to its geographical situation and isolation Australia has distinct fish fauna, including many endemic species. From the 18th century, early colonisers began introducing a number of exotic species including mammals, plant, birds and fish. The introduction of such fish has led to serious ecological damage, most notable being the effect of common carp in the Murray-Darling Basin. Introduced carp now dominate the freshwater systems of southern Australia. While the damaging impact of carp is well recognised, little in the way of control measures have been employed to control their spread. Their ability to colonise almost any body of water, even those previously considered to be beyond their physical tolerances, is now well established. Control of exotic fish species is being undertaken by various government departments, though many problems are faced.

Introduced trout species dominate the upland reaches of rivers in southeast Australia, and may have negative effects on upland native fish like the mountain galaxias species, Macquarie perch and the unfortunately named trout cod, but due to their popularity as sport fish, lack of historical records, and loss of angling memories, their damaging effects are not widely understood.

All recently established exotic fish in Australia stem from the illegal release of aquarium fish species.  With the continued and largely uncontrolled importation of many high-risk fish species for the aquarium industry, Australia continues to be at risk of further invasions of exotic fish.

List of introduced fish

American flagfish, Jordanella floridae
Atlantic salmon, Salmo salar
Brook trout, Salvelinus fontinalis
Brown trout, Salmo trutta
Chinook Salmon, Oncorhynchus tshawytscha
Common carp, Cyprinus carpio
Convict cichlid, Archocentrus nigrofasciatus
Domingo mosquitofish, Gambusia dominicensis
Eastern mosquitofish, Gambusia holbrooki
Goldfish,  Carassius auratus
Guppy, Poecilia reticulata
Jack Dempsey, Cichlasoma octofasciatum
Mosquitofish, Gambusia affinis
Mozambique mouthbrooder, Oreochromis mossambicus
One-spot live bearer, Phalloceros caudimaculatus
Platy, Xiphophorus maculatus
Rainbow trout, Oncorhynchus mykiss
Redfin perch, Perca fluviatilis
Roach,  Rutilis rutilis
Rosy barb, Puntius conchonius
Sailfin molly, Poecilia latipinna
Speckled mosquitofish, Phalloceros caudimaculatus
Spotted tilapia, Tilapia mariae
Swordtail, Xiphophorus helleri
Tench, Tinca tinca
Weather loach, Misgurnus anguillicaudatus

See also
 Invasive species in Australia
 Fauna of Australia
 Mosquitofish in Australia
 Jack Dempsey cichlids in Australia

References

 
Introduced fish
Australia